The Saint Petersburg State University of Civil Aviation is an aviation school in Saint Petersburg, Russia.

History

In 1955, the Government of the USSR in Leningrad decided to advance studies of senior commanding staff for Civil Aviation with supervision of the Civil Aviation Administration. This led to the birth of an institution named the "High School of Civil Aviation". During the early '60s the high school started its graduate department, research and publishing department and simultaneously published its first collection of scientific papers.

In 1971, the High school of Civil Aviation was awarded the highest government award that time—the "Order of Lenin". Thereafter the institute was reorganized as the "Academy of Civil Aviation" and it was moved to a new campus in Aviagorodok (Aviation town), a suburb of Leningrad next to present-day Pulkovo Airport.

The '70s in the history of the University were characterized by intensive construction and development of teaching and laboratory and residential facilities, opening of new faculties, specialties, and specialty training.

In 2004, the Academy of Civil Aviation passed the state accreditation and has received a new status - Saint-Petersburg State University of Civil Aviation (Order of the Ministry of Education and Science on 01. December 2004, № 461).

In half a century the school has prepared for civil aviation about 25 thousand of highly qualified specialists who have made significant contributions to the industry. Graduates of the University of Civil Aviation are working in airlines, regional offices, associations, air traffic control services, and in ICAO.

References 

Aviation in Russia
Universities in Saint Petersburg